Karbala Governorate ( Karbalāʾ) is a governorate in central Iraq. Its administrative center is the city of Karbala, a holy city for Shia Muslims for housing the shrine of the revered Imam Hussein. The population is majority Shia. The governorate includes part of the artificial Lake Milh.

Provincial Government
Governor: Aqil Al-Turaihi
Deputy Governor: Jawad al-Hasnawi 
Provincial Council Chairman (PCC): Abdul al-Al al-Yasseri

Districts
 Ain Al-Tamur
 Al-Hindiya
 Karbala

References

 
Governorates of Iraq
Shia Islam